Five Forks may refer to:

 The Battle of Five Forks, a battle of the American Civil War in Dinwiddie County, Virginia

Places in the United States
Five Forks, Alabama
Five Forks, Bartow County, Georgia
Five Forks, Gwinnett County, Georgia
Five Forks, Thomas County, Georgia
Five Forks, North Carolina (disambiguation), multiple places
 Five Forks, Mann Township, Bedford County, Pennsylvania
Five Forks, Franklin County, Pennsylvania
 Five Forks, Wharton Township, Fayette County, Pennsylvania
Five Forks, Greenville County, South Carolina
Five Forks, Virginia (disambiguation), multiple places
Five Forks, West Virginia (disambiguation), multiple places

Places elsewhere
Five Forks, New Zealand, in North Otago